Quercus augustinii is a rare species of tree in the beech family Fagaceae. It has been found in Vietnam as well as Guangxi, Guizhou, and Yunnan Provinces in southern China. It is placed in subgenus Cerris, section Cyclobalanopsis.

Quercus augustinii is a tree up to 10 m. tall, with orange-brown twigs and leaves as much as 120 mm long.  The acorn is oblong-ovoid, 10-17 × 8-12 mm, glabrous, apex rounded or slightly depressed; scar approx. 6 mm in diameter.

References

External links
photo of herbarium specimen at Missouri Botanical Garden, collected in Yunnan
line drawing, Flora of China Illustrations vol. 4, fig. 381, 7 

augustinii
Flora of Vietnam
Flora of Indo-China
Trees of Vietnam
Flora of China
Plants described in 1899